The 2015 South American Basketball Championship U-17 was the 23rd edition of the FIBA South America Under-17 Championship. Eight teams featured the competition, held in Resistencia, Argentina from September 13 to September 19. The first three places qualified for the 2016 FIBA Americas Under-18 Championship.

Group stage

Group A

Group B

Final round

Classification 5-8

Semifinals

Final classification games

Seventh place game

Fifth place game

Third place game

Final

Final standings

References

FIBA Archive

2015–16 in South American basketball
2015–16 in Argentine basketball
International basketball competitions hosted by Argentina